Albert Henry Hall (24 August 1880 – 10 February 1968) was an Australian rules footballer who played for the Geelong Football Club in the Victorian Football League (VFL).

Notes

External links 

1880 births
1968 deaths
Australian rules footballers from Victoria (Australia)
Geelong Football Club players